Gynnidomorpha is a genus of moths belonging to the subfamily Tortricinae of the family Tortricidae.

Species
Gynnidomorpha alismana (Ragonot, 1883)
Gynnidomorpha attenuata (Razowski, 1984)
Gynnidomorpha curviphalla Y.H. Sun & H.H. Li, 2013
Gynnidomorpha datetis (Diakonoff, 1984)
Gynnidomorpha definita (Meyrick, 1928)
Gynnidomorpha julianiensis (Liu & Ge, 1991)
Gynnidomorpha luridana (Gregson, 1870)
Gynnidomorpha mesotypa (Razowski, 1970)
Gynnidomorpha mesoxutha Turner, 1916
Gynnidomorpha minimana (Caradja, 1916)
Gynnidomorpha permixtana ([Denis & Schiffermuller], 1775)
Gynnidomorpha pista (Diakonoff, 1984)
Gynnidomorpha romonana (Kearfott, 1908)
Gynnidomorpha rubricana (Peyerimhoff, 1877)
Gynnidomorpha sphaenophora (Diakonoff, 1941)
Gynnidomorpha stirodelphys (Diakonoff, 1976)
Gynnidomorpha vectisana (Humphreys & Westwood, 1845)

See also
List of Tortricidae genera

References

 , 2011: Diagnoses and remarks on genera of Tortricidae, 2: Cochylini (Lepidoptera: Tortricidae). Shilap Revista de Lepidopterologia 39 (156): 397–414.
 , 2013: Review of the Chinese species of Gynnidomorpha Turner, 1916 (Lepidoptera: Tortricidae: Cochylini). Zootaxa 3646 (5): 545–560. Abstract: 
 , 1916, Trans. Proc. R. Soc. S. Austral. 40: 518
 , 2005 World Catalogue of Insects, 5 Tortricidae (Lepidoptera)

External links
tortricidae.com

Cochylini
Tortricidae genera